The Cass County Courthouse in Linden, Texas was built in 1859 and has remained in operation since 1861, making it the only existing Antebellum courthouse in Texas and therefore making it the oldest courthouse in continuous operation.  It was listed on the National Register of Historic Places in 1979.

It is a three-story Classical Revival-style building, with its appearance mainly deriving from c.1900 renovation/expansion.  It was damaged by a fire in 1933 but was quickly repaired.  When listed on the National Register it was the longest continually-used courthouse in Texas.

See also

National Register of Historic Places listings in Cass County, Texas
Recorded Texas Historic Landmarks in Cass County

References

External links

Courthouses on the National Register of Historic Places in Texas
Neoclassical architecture in Texas
Government buildings completed in 1859
Buildings and structures in Cass County, Texas
County courthouses in Texas
National Register of Historic Places in Cass County, Texas
Recorded Texas Historic Landmarks
1859 establishments in Texas